Virgilio Marchi (21 January 1895 – 30 April 1960) was an Italian architect and art director. He designed the sets for more than fifty films during his career. Marchi was stylistically identified with the Futurist movement.

Selected filmography
 Territorial Militia (1935)
 The Two Sergeants (1936)
 Condottieri (1937)
 Queen of the Scala (1937)
 An Adventure of Salvator Rosa (1939)
 The Marquis of Ruvolito (1939)
 The Count of Brechard (1940)
 A Pilot Returns (1942)
 Luisa Sanfelice (1942)
 Four Steps in the Clouds (1942)
 Annabella's Adventure (1943)
 Maria Malibran (1943)
 Desire (1946)
 Lost in the Dark (1947)
 Baron Carlo Mazza (1948)
 Heaven Over the Marshes (1949)
 The Flowers of St. Francis (1950)
 Margaret of Cortona (1950)
 Europe '51 (1952)
 They Were Three Hundred (1952)
 Prisoners of Darkness (1952)
 Umberto D. (1952)
 Article 519, Penal Code (1952)
 Mademoiselle Gobete (1952)
 The Return of Don Camillo (1953)
 Mata Hari's Daughter (1954)
 The Two Orphans (1954)
 Don Camillo's Last Round (1955)
 The Bigamist (1956)

References

External links 
 

1895 births
1960 deaths
20th-century Italian architects
Italian art directors
People from Livorno
Futurist architects